Sigurður Ólafsson  (7 December 1916 - 25 February 2009) was an Icelandic footballer. He was part of the Iceland national football team between 1946 and 1949. He played 4 matches.

See also
 List of Iceland international footballers

References

External links
 

Olafsson, Sigurdur
Olafsson, Sigurdur
Icelandic footballers
Iceland international footballers
Icelandic male footballers
Association footballers not categorized by position